The 2015 CAF Champions League knockout stage was played from 26 September to 8 November 2015. A total of four teams competed in the knockout stage to decide the champions of the 2015 CAF Champions League.

Qualified teams
The winners and runners-up of each of the two groups in the group stage qualified for the knockout stage.

Format
Knockout ties were played on a home-and-away two-legged basis. If the aggregate score was tied after the second leg, the away goals rule would be applied, and if still level, the penalty shoot-out would be used to determine the winner (no extra time would be played).

Schedule
The schedule of each round was as follows.

Bracket
In the semi-finals, the group A winners played the group B runners-up, and the group B winners played the group A runners-up, with the group winners hosting the second leg.

In the final, the order of legs was determined by a draw, held after the group stage draw (5 May 2015, 11:00 UTC+2, at the CAF headquarters in Cairo, Egypt).

Semi-finals

|}

TP Mazembe won 4–2 on aggregate.

USM Alger won 2–1 on aggregate.

Final

|}

TP Mazembe won 4–1 on aggregate.

References

External links
Orange CAF Champions League 2015, CAFonline.com

3